Dimethylhexane may refer to any of several isomeric chemical compounds:

 
 2,3-Dimethylhexane
 2,4-Dimethylhexane
 2,5-Dimethylhexane
 3,3-Dimethylhexane